Stegomyrmex is a Neotropical genus of ants in the subfamily Myrmicinae. Strictly Neotropical in its distribution, the genus is known from Costa Rica to northern Argentina. It was once considered rare, but more recent sampling has revealed that the genus is relatively common in the leaf litter.

Species
Stegomyrmex bensoni Feitosa, Brandão & Diniz, 2008 – Brazil
Stegomyrmex connectens Emery, 1912 – Peru and Bolivia
Stegomyrmex manni Smith, 1946 – Costa Rica, Panama, and Colombia
Stegomyrmex olindae Feitosa, Brandão & Diniz, 2008 – Brazil
Stegomyrmex vizottoi Diniz, 1990 – Argentina, Paraguay and Brazil

References

External links

Myrmicinae
Ant genera
Hymenoptera of North America
Hymenoptera of South America